APAC or Apac may refer to:

Places
 Apac, a city in Uganda
 Apac District, the district of Uganda in which the city is located
 Asia-Pacific, a country grouping and region in Asia and Oceania

Arts, entertainment, and media
 A-PAC, Australian Public Affairs Channel, a pay television news service
 Asia, Pacific and Africa Collections, British Library, a documents collection of the British Library in London, England

Enterprises and organizations
 Adult Performer Advocacy Committee, an American organized labor group for pornographic actors
 Atlas Performing Arts Center, an arts center in Washington, DC, United States
 Australia Pacific Airports Corporation, an Australian airports operator
 Australian Partnership for Advanced Computing, a computer science organisation
 Australian Psychology Accreditation Council, a psychology accreditation organisation

Events
 Asia Pacific Activities Conference, an international schools event
 Asia-Pacific Amateur Championship, a golf tournament
 Audio Publishers Association Conference, an annual audiobook publisher/narrator event

See also
 American Israel Public Affairs Committee (sometimes referred to as AIPAC), a political lobby